Sincronía (stylized onscreen as Sincronía, tú eliges como ver la realidad) is a Mexican drama-suspense streaming television series produced by Gustavo Loza for Blim. It premiered on March 1, 2017.

The series features a large ensemble cast, including actors recognized as Sofía Sisniega, Juan Pablo Medina, María Rojo, Manuel "Flaco" Ibáñez, Tommy Vásquez, Claudia Ramírez and Marco Pérez.

Plot 
The series follows the different points of view between the people involved in the same forceful event, with the force of changing the destiny of all those involved. Addressing strong and topical issues such as kidnapping, trafficking in persons, influence peddling or child abuse; You will know what happens to the lives of the victims, the victimizers and those who for some reason are involved in situations where it is not easy to get ahead.

Cast 
 Sofía Sisniega as Paola
 Juan Pablo Medina as Alberto
 María Rojo as Madame
 Manuel "Flaco" Ibáñez as Padre García
 Tommy Vásquez as Caliman
 Claudia Ramírez as Lourdes
 Marco Pérez as Gobernador
 Héctor Kotsifakis as Héctor
 Úrsula Pruneda as Martha
 Ramón Medína as Israel
 Pablo Bracho as Padre Horacio
 Luis Fernando Peña as Zoloco
 Fernando Trujillo as José
 Arturo Vázquez as Papá de Carla
 Germán Branco as Román
 Nando Estevane as Padre Bonner
 Jorge Adrián Espíndola as Padre Galguera
 Christian Vega as Bernardo

References

External links 
 

2017 Mexican television series debuts
Blim TV original programming
Spanish-language television shows
2010s Mexican television series
Mexican drama television series